Cesare Tallone (1853–1919) was an Italian painter.

Biography
Born in Savona and after losing his father at the age of ten, Cesare Tallone moved with his mother and sisters to Alessandria, where he became a pupil of the decorative artist Pietro Sassi. Some members of the local bourgeoisie commissioned the first portraits from him and persuaded the City Council to finance his studies. Thanks to this financial aid, Tallone was able to enrol in the Brera Academy in 1872, studying under Raffaele Casnedi, Luigi Riccardi and Giuseppe Bertini until 1880. His talent was obvious from his very first works and was recognised by Francesco Hayez, who allowed him the use of his own studio near the Academy. An active participant in the lively cultural milieu in Milan and member of the Famiglia Artistica since its foundation in 1873 by Vespasiano Bignami.

He won the triennial combined schools of painting competition at the Brera exhibition in 1879, with a historical subject. He reprised this subject for the canvas shown together with the Portrait of Luigi Bernasconi (Rome, Galleria Nazionale d’Arte Moderna) at the "Esposizione di Belle Arti" di Roma in 1883. Tallone often spent time in Rome with Antonio Mancini and Francesco Paolo Michetti. His success with public and critics alike was confirmed the following year at the Esposizione Generale Italiana in Turin. In 1885, he was appointed teacher of painting at the Carrara Academy, in Bergamo, a position which he also held at the Brera Academy from 1899, succeeding Bertini. During these years he continued to exhibit his works and he became known as a portraitist in intellectual, bourgeois and aristocratic circles. One of the last awards he won was the Principe Umberto Prize in 1908, and an entire room was devoted to his works at the Esposizione Internazionale d’Arte di Venezia the same year. He died in Milan. In 1921, on the initiative of his friend Bignami, the Brera Academy commemorated him with a posthumous retrospective.

Artworks

References
 Laura Casone, Cesare Tallone, online catalogue Artgate by Fondazione Cariplo, 2010, CC BY-SA (source for the first revision of this article).

Further reading 
 Gigliola Tallone, Cesare Tallone, Electa Mondadori, 2005. .
 Laura Casone, Cesare Tallone, catalog online Artgate della Fondazione Cariplo, 2010, CC-BY-SA.
 Manuel Carrera, "Una ritrattistica manciniana nelle collezioni della GNAM. Da Cesare Tallone agli artisti della Secessione romana", Belle Arti 131, n. 2, 2013, pp. 40–53.

External links 
 

1853 births
1919 deaths
19th-century Italian painters
Italian male painters
20th-century Italian painters
Brera Academy alumni
People from Savona
19th-century Italian male artists
20th-century Italian male artists